Heritage Creek Airstrip  is a privately owned public airport in Rhome, Wise County, Texas, United States, that also serves the city of Decatur, being located approximately  southeast of the central business district. The airport has no IATA or ICAO designation.

The airport is used solely for general aviation purposes.

Facilities 
 Runway 13/31: 3,000 x 60 ft. (914 x 18 m), Surface: Turf

For the 12-month period ending 31 December 2015 the airport had 2,190 aircraft operations, an average of 6 per day: 100% general aviation. At that time there were 33 aircraft based at this airport: 79% single-engine, 9% ultralights, 6% helicopters, and 6% gliders, with no multi-engine or jets.

References

External links 
  at Texas DOT Airport Directory

Airports in Texas
Airports in the Dallas–Fort Worth metroplex
Transportation in Wise County, Texas